Nakskov is a town in south Denmark. It is situated in Lolland municipality in Region Sjælland on the western coast of the island of Lolland. The town has a population of 12,495 (1 January 2022). To the west is Nakskov Fjord, an inlet from the Langeland Belt (Langelandsbælt) that runs between the islands of Lolland and Langeland. Nakskov Fjord is a wildlife reserve, known for its bird life.

History

Nakskov is in the inner part of the Western inlet of Lolland, one of the agriculturally richest of the Danish islands. The area was settled during the neolithic period and has been continuously inhabited since. The town received trade privileges in 1266, during the reign of king Erik V Glipping. Once the export center of western Lolland, Nakskov thrived on trade, commerce and industry. This changed gradually as overland traffic was enabled by a railway to the neighboring island of Falster in 1875. The connection to Sjælland and Copenhagen over the Storstrømsbroen bridge in 1937 shifted goods from the port of Nakskov. Although traditionally a center of manufacturing and industry, when Denmark joined the EEC and the subsidies were dismantled, causing the industrial boom in shipbuilding to end, Nakskov has turned to commerce and trade.

Nakskov is one of the most environmentally conscious and cleanest towns of Denmark. Technological and environmental enterprises replace heavy industries. In recent years, local government has restored the town.

Transport
Nakskov is connected to Nykøbing Falster and the rail network by the Lollandsbanen line.

Boats run from Nakskov to the islands of Nakskov Fjord (Slotø, Vejlø, Enehøje, and Albuen). A ferry connects the Nakskov through the Langeland Belt to Spodsbjerg on the island of Langeland. Bus runs within the town and to neighbouring areas. Bike routes follow the levees encompassing Lolland.

Economy
Denmark's largest sugar factory is located in Nakskov. It processes about 12,000 tons of sugar beet per day and belongs to the German group Nordzucker.

Nakskov municipality
Until 1 January 2007, "Nakskov" was also the name of a municipality (Danish, kommune) covering an area of 33 km², and with a total population of 14,745 (2006). Nowadays Nakskov is integrated into, and encompassed by, Lolland municipality. The last mayor of Nakskov was Flemming Bonne Hansen, a member of the Socialist People's Party (Socialistisk Folkeparti) political party. Nakskov municipality ceased to exist as the result of Kommunalreformen ("The Municipality Reform" of 2007). It was merged with Holeby, Højreby, Maribo, Ravnsborg, Rudbjerg and Rødby municipalities to form the new Lolland municipality. This new municipality consists of an area of 892 km² and a total population of 48,634 (2007).

Attractions
Nakskov Church, dating to the early 13th century, has carved works from the Baroque period including the pulpit (1630) by Jørgen Ringnis and the altarpiece (1656) by Anders Mortensen. 

Large parts of the wetlands around Nakskov were drained in the 19th century. The levee along the southern shore of the fjord allows to travel by foot or on a bicycle to Langø. Another attraction of Nakskov is the Danish sugar museum (sukkermuseum). The town also used to display an ex-Soviet submarine designated S-359 or U-359.

Notable people 

 Jørgen Ringnis (birth date unknown, died 1652 in Nakskov) a Danish woodcarver of altarpieces and pulpits
 Martin Severin From (1828–1895) soldier, civil servant and Danish chess master
 Hans Niels Andersen (1852–1937) a shipping magnate, businessman, founded the East Asiatic Company
 Ludovica Levy (1856–1922) a Danish actress, theatre director and theatre critic
 Johan Jensen (1859–1925) a Danish mathematician and engineer
 August Enna (1859–1939) a Danish composer, known mainly for his operas
 Johannes Wilhjelm (1868–1938) a Danish painter of bright, colourful landscapes 
 Jørgen Skafte Rasmussen (1878–1964) a Danish engineer and industrialist
 Paul Hagen (1920 – 2003 in Nakskov) a Danish film and television actor 
 Per Mollerup (born 1942) a Danish designer, academic, and author
 Ole Kiehn (born 1958) a Danish-Swedish neuroscientist and academic
 Stefan Wenzel (born 1962) a German politician for the Alliance '90/The Greens
 Helle Helle (born 1965) a widely translated Danish short story writer and novelist
 Lisbeth Zornig Andersen (born 1968) a Danish economist, activist and author 
 Blak (born 1989) a Danish rapper and songwriter; stage name of Henrik Blak

Sport 
 Mette Jacobsen (born 1973) a Danish freestyle and butterfly swimmer, competed in five consecutive Summer Olympics from 1988
 Lee Rochester Sørensen (born 1994) a Danish-Jamaican footballer

Gallery

See also
Lolland Hydrogen Community

References

External links

 Lolland municipality's official website (Danish only)
Municipal statistics: NetBorger Kommunefakta, delivered from KMD aka Kommunedata (Municipal Data)
 Municipal mergers and neighbors: Eniro new municipalities map

Nakskov
Former municipalities of Denmark
Cities and towns in Region Zealand
Viking Age populated places
Lolland
Lolland Municipality